Innovation is a bus stop on Ottawa, Ontario's transitway. It is served by OC Transpo buses and is named after nearby Innovation Drive in the Kanata North Technology Park. Its primary purpose is as a park and ride facility for those in north Kanata. It opened in December 2016 for the 2016 winter service change, and is served by rapid route 63.

Service

The following routes serve Innovation station as of October 6 2019:

See also
 OC Transpo
 OC Transpo routes
 Transitway (Ottawa)
 Kanata, Ontario

References

External links

2016 establishments in Ontario
Transitway (Ottawa) stations